This is the complete list of Commonwealth Games medallists in synchronised swimming from 1986 to 2010.

Solo

Duet

Figures

References
Results Database from the Commonwealth Games Federation

Medalists

Synchr